Eric Visser (born 4 June 1951) is the founder of both the Dutch publishing house De Geus and the Dutch-based publishing house World Editions.

De Geus
In 1983, he founded Dutch independent publishing house De Geus. Since then, he has always worked in publishing, as a publisher and managing director of De Geus. The start was difficult; De Geus was based in Breda, while most of the other publishing houses were in Amsterdam, because of this others didn’t think De Geus would be successful. But as a firm believer in the saying: "The world starts where you are", Visser was prepared to do the hard work. He even typed out and stapled the pages of the first title himself. And the hard work paid off; De Geus grew steadily each year. To date, De Geus has published over 2500 books.
 
Visser wanted to publish beautiful books; books that matter, that have depth and discuss social issues. The books had to reflect society, which is why De Geus always strives to publish literature from all over the world by as many female as male authors. After thirty years, De Geus still has the same objective—to surprise readers and seduce them to go on a voyage of discovery over and over again.

Throughout the years Eric Visser and de Geus have published some of the best authors from around the globe, such as Maya Angelou, Alaa Al-Aswany, Majgull Axelsson, Alessando Baricco, Pat Barker, Aifric Campbell, Javier Cercas, and Jim Crace.  Fourteen authors published by De Geus have gone on to win the Nobel Prize for Literature. Since 2008, J.M.G. Le Clézio, Herta Müller, Mo Yan and Alice Munro have won the prize. Eric Visser wanted to unlock important literary titles from established authors, but it has always been important for Visser and De Geus to find and nurture new talents as well. Kader Abdolah, Esther Gerritsen and Annelies Verbeke’s  debut novels were all published by De Geus, and now they are among the best writers of Dutch and Flemish literature.

In addition to working for De Geus and World Editions, Eric Visser was a board member for The General Publishing Group of the Dutch Publishers Association (which represents the interests of the affiliated publishing companies throughout the Netherlands) and for Literature Festival Winternachten in The Hague (a cultural festival with more than eighty writers, artists and musicians from approximately fifteen countries) and for the CPNB (Collective Promotion for the Dutch Book). He is also a member of the PEN International Publishers Circle.

In 2016, De Geus was sold to Singel Uitgeverijen and will relocate to Amsterdam.

World Editions
In 2013, Eric Visser started a new publishing house World Editions, a spin-off of De Geus. WE aims to make important titles available for the greatest possible audience. WE publishes in English for the international market. The first titles were published in 2015: Craving by Esther Gerritsen, Gliding Flight by Anne-Gine Goemans, and Saturday’s Shadows by Ayesha Harruna Attah.

Awards and honours
In 2012 Eric received the French Chevalier des Arts et des Lettres award. In 2015, he was conferred as a Knight of the First Class Royal Norwegian Order of Merit.

References

1951 births
Living people
Dutch publishers (people)